Rowletta is a locality in the Rural Municipality of Marquis No. 191, Saskatchewan, Canada. It is located about 5 km west of Highway 643 on Range Road 35, approximately 10 km northwest of the Village of Caronport on the former Grand Trunk Pacific/(Canadian National Railways) Central Butte Subdivision. Rowletta Civic Centre is located to the south of Rowletta at the intersection of Township Road 190 and Range Road 292.

See also

 List of communities in Saskatchewan

References

Marquis No. 191, Saskatchewan
Unincorporated communities in Saskatchewan